The second season of the ABC American television drama series How to Get Away with Murder was ordered on May 7, 2015, by ABC. The second season began airing on September 24, 2015, with 15 episodes like the previous season, and concluded on March 17, 2016. The smaller episode count than most network series stems from a deal with series star Viola Davis that the show would produce only 15 or 16 episodes per season. A promotional poster was released on August 18, and the trailer was released on September 10.

In its second season, the series has continued to receive accolades; the show has been nominated for Outstanding Drama Series at the Image Awards as well as the GLAAD Awards. Viola Davis has won the Screen Actors Guild Award for Outstanding Performance in a Drama Series and has been nominated for Outstanding Lead Actress in a Drama Series at the Primetime Emmy Awards, Outstanding Actress in a Drama Series at the Image Awards, Best Actress in a Drama Series at the Critics' Choice Awards, and Best Actress in a Television Series at the Golden Globe Awards.

Plot
Annalise Keating, law professor and criminal defense attorney at Middleton University, selects five students to intern at her firm: Wes Gibbins, Connor Walsh, Michaela Pratt, Asher Millstone, and Laurel Castillo—along with Annalise's employees Frank Delfino and Bonnie Winterbottom, an associate lawyer.

The first nine episodes focus on Annalise's case of Caleb and Catherine Hapstall and their alleged involvement in the death of their adoptive parents. Wes, in the meantime, teams up with Rebecca's foster brother to try and find Rebecca. Connor struggles with his relationship with Oliver, while Asher works with ADA Emily Sinclair in order to protect his secrets. In the mid-season finale, Sinclair is murdered by Asher, and Annalise helps cover it up, at the expense of her being shot in the stomach by Wes.

The second part of the season focuses on Wes' investigation around his mother's suicide ten years prior, and it is revealed from flashbacks how involved Annalise was with Wes' mother's suicide. The season ends with Annalise finding out that Frank was responsible for her being in a car accident and losing her baby, and sending him away as a result. Michaela and Asher have sex, and Wes meets with his biological father right before the latter is shot dead by an unknown sniper.

Cast and characters

Main
 Viola Davis as Annalise Keating
 Billy Brown as Nate Lahey
 Alfred Enoch as Wes Gibbins
 Jack Falahee as Connor Walsh
 Aja Naomi King as Michaela Pratt
 Matt McGorry as Asher Millstone
 Karla Souza as Laurel Castillo
 Charlie Weber as Frank Delfino
 Liza Weil as Bonnie Winterbottom

Recurring
 Sarah Burns as Emily Sinclair
 Kendrick Sampson as Caleb Hapstall
 Amy Okuda as Catherine Hapstall
 Famke Janssen as Eve Rothlo
 Conrad Ricamora as Oliver Hampton
 John Posey as William Millstone
 Matt Cohen as Levi Wescott
 Jefferson White as Philip Jessup
 Kelsey Scott as Rose Edmond
 Issac Ryan Brown as Christophe Edmond
 Tom Verica as Sam Keating
 Adam Arkin as Wallace Mahoney
 Benito Martinez as Todd Denver

Guest
 Katie Findlay as Rebecca Sutter
 Joan McMurtrey as Helena Hapstall
 Sherri Saum as Tanya Randolph
 Enuka Okuma as Nia Lahey
 Alexandra Billings as Jill Hartford
 Wilson Bethel as Charles Mahoney
 Roxanne Hart as Sylvia Mahoney
 Jennifer Parsons as Lydia Millstone 
 Cicely Tyson as Ophelia Harkness
 Emily Swallow as Lisa Cameron
 Roger Robinson as Mac Harkness
 Gwendolyn Mulamba as Celestine Harkness

Episodes

Production

Development
The series was renewed for a second season on May 7, 2015, by ABC. The show was effectively confirmed as earning a second-season renewal for the 2015–16 season via a promo succeeding the first-season finale and an earlier statement by Viola Davis also confirming the renewal at the close of shooting for the first season. It would contain 15 episodes, like the previous season. Entertainment Weekly reported on July 23, 2015, that the identity of Rebecca's killer would be revealed in the season premiere. A promotional poster was released over a month before the season premiere, on August 17, 2015.

The second season began airing on September 24, 2015, and aired nine episodes in the fall, just like the rest of ABC's primetime lineup "TGIT" Grey's Anatomy and Scandal. The remaining fall schedule for ABC was announced on November 16, 2015, where it was announced that How to Get Away with Murder would air nine episodes in the fall with the fall finale to air on November 19, 2015, just like the rest of ABC's primetime lineup "TGIT", which was the same last year. The remaining six episodes aired after the winter break, beginning on February 11, 2016, as a result of ABC airing the television miniseries Madoff over two nights on February 3–4, 2016 in the same time-slot as Scandal and Grey's Anatomy. It aired its season finale on March 17, 2016, with The Catch succeeding it for the remainder of the 2015–16 season after its finale. On March 3, 2016, ABC announced that How to Get Away with Murder was renewed for a third season.

Filming
Production began on May 21, 2015, with Shonda Rhimes announcing on Twitter that Peter Nowalk and his writers were in full swing mapping the second season. The table read for the premiere occurred on July 14, 2015, with the title of the episode being revealed at the same time.

Casting

The second season had nine roles receiving star billing, with all of them returning from the previous season. Viola Davis played the protagonist of the series, Professor Annalise Keating, a high-profile defense attorney, teaching a class at Middleton University. Billy Brown played Detective Nate Lahey, Annalise's lover. There are five students who work at Annalise's law firm. Alfred Enoch portrayed Wes Gibbins, as he was devastated about Rebecca escaping. Jack Falahee portrayed Connor Walsh, the ruthless student who found himself in a situation where his boyfriend Oliver Hampton, played by Conrad Ricamora, had received news of having HIV. Aja Naomi King played Michaela Pratt, the ambitious student who wanted to be as successful as Annalise. Matt McGorry continued portraying Asher Millstone, a student who comes from a privileged background. Karla Souza played Laurel Castillo, an idealistic student. Charlie Weber portrayed Frank Delfino, an employee of Annalise's firm who is not a lawyer but handles special duties requiring discretion. Liza Weil played Bonnie Winterbottom, who is an associate attorney in Annalise's firm.

It was announced on July 14, 2015, that the second season would introduce several new characters, including a family consisting of Caleb, Catherine and Helena Hapstall. Katie Findlay returned to play the character Rebecca Sutter, who was killed in the first-season finale. Tom Verica also appeared in the season as the deceased Sam Keating, and appeared in flashbacks. On July 22, 2015, it was announced that Kendrick Sampson, known from The Vampire Diaries would join the cast in the second season and was introduced in the season premiere. On July 31, 2015, TVLine reported that Famke Janssen was cast as a brilliant, revered defense attorney for a multi-episode arc and would first appear in the season premiere.

Matt Cohen was announced on August 11, 2015, to recur in the second season as Levi, who was described as a sexy, edgy working class guy. He first appeared in the second episode and appeared in a total of three episodes. On August 31, 2015, Variety reported that Amy Okuda would play a recurring role, but details on Okuda's part were being kept under wraps. Sherri Saum was announced to have been cast as a guest star on September 30, 2015. On January 14, 2016, it was announced that Wilson Bethel, Adam Arkin and Roxanne Hart would be joining the show to play the Mahoney family. Bethel played Charles Mahoney, the Ivy League-educated son, with Arkin playing his father Wallace and Hart playing his mother Sylvia.

Reception

Critical response
The second season received positive reviews. On Rotten Tomatoes, it has an approval rating of 95%, based on 5 reviews, with an average rating of 8.5 out of 10. Lesley Brock, Paste Magazine, praised the second season writing: "I would not put it past How to Get Away with Murder, which has turned all other ABC show plot lines upside down on their heads and shown that nothing is impossible, to throw incest into an already haphazard mix." Brock gave the season a score of 9 out of 10. Kyle Anderson, Entertainment weekly, wrote that with Davis at the front the show can get away with anything.

Ratings

Accolades

Critics' top ten lists
 No. 10 TV Line

DVD release
The DVD was first released in Region 1 on June 21, 2016.

References

External links

 
 

2015 American television seasons
2016 American television seasons
Season 2